The 23 Division is a division of the Sri Lanka Army. Established on 1 January 1990 as the 3 Division. It was renamed as the 23 Division on 23 Jul 1997. The division is currently based in Punanai in the Eastern Province. The division is a part of Security Forces Headquarters – East and has three brigades.

References

1990 establishments in Sri Lanka
Military units and formations established in 1990
Organisations based in Eastern Province, Sri Lanka
Sri Lanka Army divisions